The following are the 26 postures of Bikram Yoga, as it names them; some of the Sanskrit names differ from those used for the same or closely related poses in other schools of yoga, and some of them are otherwise used for different poses. The postures include 24 asanas (poses in modern yoga as exercise), one pranayama breathing exercise, and one shatkarma, a purification making use of forced breathing. Bikram Yoga was devised by Bikram Choudhury around 1971 when he moved to America.

References

Yoga series